Jan Kurnakowicz (27 January 1901 – 4 October 1968) was a Polish film actor. He appeared in 24 films between 1929 and 1958.

Selected filmography
 Prokurator Alicja Horn (1933)
 Bohaterowie Sybiru (1936)
 Pan Twardowski (1936)
 Unvanquished City (1950)
 Warsaw Premiere (1951)
 A Matter to Settle (1953)

References

External links

1901 births
1968 deaths
Polish male film actors
Male actors from Vilnius
20th-century Polish male actors